The League Championship Series (LCS) is the semifinal round of postseason play in Major League Baseball which has been conducted since 1969. In 1981, and since 1995, the two annual series have matched up the winners of the Division Series, and the winners advance to meet in the World Series. The LCS comprises the American League Championship Series (ALCS) and National League Championship Series (NLCS).

History
Both leagues then formed Eastern and Western Divisions, the first-place teams from which faced off in the LCS.

For its first sixteen seasons, the League Championship Series were best-of-five, using the  format in which the team without home field advantage hosted the first two games, and the team with it hosted the rest of the LCS, making it impossible for the disadvantaged team to win the series at home. It also allowed those teams the unusual luxury of starting a series at home, possibly having home-field advantage in a three-game series, and a guarantee that they play two games at home.

In , the LCS was lengthened to best-of-seven games in the  format with the team holding home-field advantage opening the series at home and playing the next three games on the road, before returning home for two more possible games. The disadvantaged team would have had more games played at home than on the road if the series ends in five games.

Since , the LCS has matched up the winners of the Division Series, which were added when both leagues realigned into three divisions.

Until , the home-field advantage in the LCS was allocated on a rotating basis between the two (three from 1995 through ) division champions; since 1998, that advantage is given to the team with the better regular season record, except that if a division champion faces a wild card team, the division champion always gets home-field advantage regardless of record.

The Houston Astros and Milwaukee Brewers are the only teams to have played in both the ALCS and NLCS. Four teams have never lost an LCS:  the Colorado Rockies (won in 2007), the Miami Marlins (won as the Florida Marlins in 1997 and 2003), the Tampa Bay Rays (won in 2008 and 2020), and the Texas Rangers (won in 2010 and 2011). Out of this group, only the Marlins have won a World Series title; they did it both times they reached the NLCS.

See also
 League Championship Series Most Valuable Player Award

References

External links

League Championship Series at Baseball Almanac

Major League Baseball postseason
National League Championship Series
American League Championship Series
Recurring sporting events established in 1969
October sporting events
Annual events in Major League Baseball